Mount Waterhouse is a mountain rising above 1800 m, at the north west extreme of the All-Blacks Nunataks, west of the Churchill Mountains. Named in honor of Emma Waterhouse, Environmental Manager with Antarctica New Zealand from 1993 - 2001. First trip to ice 1987. Emma played a key role in the development of New Zealand systems to implement the Protocol on Environmental Protection to the Antarctic Treaty and its Act.

Mountains of Oates Land